MTV Finland was a music and entertainment channel broadcasting to the Finnish market.

The channel replaced MTV Nordic on September 18, 2005, however on February 22, 2019, it was replaced by the return of MTV Nordic.

History

 MTV Finland launched in September 2005 along with MTV Sweden and MTV Norge. Before the start of country-specific channels, Denmark, Sweden, Norway and Finland had been served by a common channel called MTV Nordic, launched on June 5, 1998, which replaced the MTV Europe feed.
 MTV Finland's offices are based at MTV Networks International's Nordic offices in Stockholm with a local office in Helsinki. The channel is broadcast from the MTV Networks Europe headquarters in London and Warsaw.
During the days of MTV Nordic, languages other than English were rarely spoken on MTV in Finland. With the start of MTV Finland, several Finnish language programmes were produced for example MTV News, Axl Meets, MTV Festival Report and Headbangers Ball. All hosted by MTV VJ Axl Smith.
Since the mid-2000s MTV Finland shares a similar schedule to its other European counterparts featuring mainly reality based content from MTV US and very few music videos.
Since 2009, MTV Finland's localized content has been reduced this is seen both on-air and on-line. Its website musictelevision.fi is entirely in English where previously it was available in Finnish. All programming is in English with Finnish subtitles, with exception to local produced programming and local advertising.
On February 22, 2019, the local MTV channels for the Nordic region were replaced by the relaunch of MTV Nordic which features no advertising or sponsorships. Despite this, separate websites still exist for the local languages.

References 

Television channels in Finland
MTV channels
Television channels and stations established in 2005
2005 establishments in Finland
Finnish music websites